Alexandre Charles Sixte "Alex" Jany (5 January 1929 – 18 July 2001) was a French freestyle swimmer and water polo player. As a swimmer, he competed in 100–400 m events at the 1948, 1952 and 1956 Olympics, alongside his sister Ginette Jany-Sendral, and he won bronze medals in the 4 × 200 m relay in 1948 and 1952. In 1948 he placed fifth-sixth in the individual 100 m and 400 m events; he won those events at the 1947 and 1950 European championships, setting world records in both in 1947. At the 1960 Olympics he competed only in water polo and placed ninth. In 1977 he was inducted into the International Swimming Hall of Fame.

He won the 1946 ASA British 'Open' National Championship 100 metres freestyle title.

See also
 List of members of the International Swimming Hall of Fame

References

External links

1929 births
2001 deaths
Sportspeople from Toulouse
Olympic swimmers of France
Swimmers at the 1948 Summer Olympics
Swimmers at the 1952 Summer Olympics
Swimmers at the 1956 Summer Olympics
Olympic bronze medalists for France
World record setters in swimming
Olympic bronze medalists in swimming
French male freestyle swimmers
European Aquatics Championships medalists in swimming
Medalists at the 1952 Summer Olympics
Medalists at the 1948 Summer Olympics
Mediterranean Games gold medalists for France
Swimmers at the 1951 Mediterranean Games
Mediterranean Games medalists in swimming
Olympic water polo players of France
Water polo players at the 1960 Summer Olympics